Pseudooceanicola atlanticus is a Gram-negative and rod-shaped bacterium from the genus of Pseudooceanicola which has been isolated from seawater from the Atlantic Ocean.

References 

Rhodobacteraceae
Bacteria described in 2015